Aspects of the Sensual World is an EP by the British singer Kate Bush, released in 1990. All of the songs included had previously been released as B-Sides in the UK and Europe through 1989.

Track listing

See also
The Sensual World
Kate Bush discography

References

Kate Bush albums
1990 albums
Columbia Records albums
Progressive pop albums
Art rock albums by English artists
Art rock EPs